DG 307 was a Czech underground rock band founded in 1973 in Prague by Milan Hlavsa and Pavel Zajíček. The group has been inactive since 2016.

Overview
Bass guitarist Milan Hlavsa and poet Pavel Zajíček launched DG 307 in 1973, taking the name from a psychiatric diagnosis that allowed young men to obtain a blue booklet and thus avoid compulsory military service. Together with the Plastic People of the Universe, a band Hlavsa had also been a member of, DG 307, among other underground ensembles, was a target of persecution by the communist regime. The repression climaxed in 1976, when Zajíček was arrested and imprisoned for a year, allegedly for disorderly conduct. After his release, only two DG 307 concerts took place, in 1979. In 1980, Zajíček emigrated and the group went on indefinite hiatus. The Velvet Revolution in 1989 made it possible for Zajíček to return to his homeland, at which point he reestablished the band and became its lead singer. Since 2016, the group has been inactive due to Zajíček's health.

The only permanent member of DG 307 throughout its existence was Pavel Zajíček. The group had a rotating membership of musicians that at various times included Josef Janíček, Jan Sahara Hedl, and Eva Turnová.

Partial list of band members

 Pavel Zajíček – vocals
 Milan Hlavsa – bass guitar
 Jana Jonáková – vocals
 Ivo Pospíšil – bass guitar
 Ivan Bierhanzl – bass guitar, double bass
 Tomáš Vtípil – violin, electronics
 Tomáš Schilla – cello
 Petr Fučík – drums
 Ivan Manolov – electric guitar
 René Starhon – drums
 Antonín Korb – drums

 Otakar "Alfréd" Michl – guitar
 Pavel Cigánek – guitar, violin
 Michal Koval – bass guitar
 Přemek Drozd – drums
 Dalibor Pyš – violin
 Oto Sukovský – bass guitar
 Eva Turnová – bass guitar

Discography

 Gift to the Shadows (fragment) (1982)
 DG 307 (1973–75) (1990)
 Dar stínům (jaro 1979) (1992)
 Pták utrženej ze řetězu (podzim 1979) (1993)
 Torzo (léto 1980) (1993)
 Umělě ochuceno (Artificially flavored) (1992)
 Tvář jako Botticelliho Anděl (Live bootleg – 1995)
 Kniha psaná chaosem (1996)
 Siluety (1998)
 Koncert (1999)

 Šepoty a výkřiky (2002)
 Historie hysterie (1973–75 recordings) (2002)
 Nosferatu (soundtrack to the film Nosferatu – 2004))
 DG 307 – LIVE (17.4.2005) (2005)
 Květy podzimu – barvy jara /live at La Fabrika (2008)
 Veřejná zkouška/Public rehearsal Praha-New York (2009)
 Magický město vyhořelo (1994 live recording – 2008)
 V katedrálách ticha (1994 live recording – 2011)
 Životy? Nebo bludné kruhy? (2013)
 Svědek spálenýho času /komplet nahrávek z let 1979–1980'' (5CDs – 2013)

References

External links
 DG 307 at Bandzone

Czech alternative rock groups
Czech underground music groups
Musical groups from Prague
1973 establishments in Czechoslovakia
2016 disestablishments in the Czech Republic
Musical groups established in 1973
Musical groups disestablished in 2016